VSN may refer to:

 Very Smooth Number, used in a very smooth hash in cryptography
 Victory Sports Network, an American sports news website
 Virtual sensor network, a type of wireless computer network
 Volontaires de la Sécurité Nationale, also known as Tonton Macoute, a Haitian paramilitary force